Dominik Picak (born 12 February 1992) is a Croatian football goalkeeper who plays for Croatian club NK Sesvete  .

Club career
Picak was promoted to Dinamo Zagreb's first team in the summer of 2009, becoming the third-choice goalkeeper behind Tomislav Butina and Filip Lončarić after the club's previous second-choice goalkeeper, Ivan Kelava, was loaned to Lokomotiva Zagreb. He made his competitive debut for the first team on 6 December 2009 in Dinamo's 4–1 away win at NK Međimurje in the Croatian First League, playing the whole match due to injuries to both Butina and Lončarić.

In January 2010, Picak was sent to Lokomotiva Zagreb with whom he initially signed a stipend contract. He did not appear in any competitive matches for the club until the end of the 2009–10 season, playing for the U19 team and serving as back-up for fellow Dinamo Zagreb loanee Ivan Kelava, and the club signed a 7-year professional contract with him in August 2010.

International career
In 2007, Picak started playing for the Croatian national under-15 football team, and also made his debut for the country's under-17 national team during the same year. In 2010, he was promoted to the country's under-19 national team. Up to date, he won a total of 33 international caps for the Croatian national football teams at the under-15 to under-19 levels.

On 11 August 2013, due to Danijel Subašić's injury, Picak was called up as a replacement, by Croatia's head coach Igor Štimac for a friendly match against Liechtenstein on 14 August 2013.

References

External links

1992 births
Living people
Footballers from Zagreb
Association football goalkeepers
Croatian footballers
Croatia youth international footballers
Croatia under-21 international footballers
GNK Dinamo Zagreb players
NK Lokomotiva Zagreb players
NK Slaven Belupo players
NK Zavrč players
BV Cloppenburg players
NK Dugopolje players
NK Rudeš players
NK Kustošija players
SV Babelsberg 03 players
UiTM FC players
NK Sesvete players
Croatian Football League players
Slovenian PrvaLiga players
First Football League (Croatia) players
Regionalliga players
Malaysia Super League players
Croatian expatriate footballers
Expatriate footballers in Slovenia
Croatian expatriate sportspeople in Slovenia
Expatriate footballers in Germany
Croatian expatriate sportspeople in Germany
Expatriate footballers in Malaysia
Croatian expatriate sportspeople in Malaysia